Cockley Beck is a small hamlet, situated in the Duddon Valley in Cumbria, England. Historically, the hamlet was part of Lancashire.

Located today within the Lake District National Park, it was established in the late 16th century, and is closely associated with the mining of copper ore in Cumbria.

References

Hamlets in Cumbria
South Lakeland District